Kijima Dam is a gravity dam located in Shimane Prefecture in Japan. The dam is used for power production. The catchment area of the dam is 140.2 km2. The dam impounds about 160  ha of land when full and can store 23470 thousand cubic meters of water. The construction of the dam was completed in 1956.

References

Dams in Shimane Prefecture
1956 establishments in Japan